Karaginsky District is an administrative and municipal district (raion) of Koryak Okrug of Kamchatka Krai, Russia, one of the eleven in the krai. It is located in the northern central part of the krai. Its administrative center is the urban locality (a settlement) of Ossora. Population:  The population of Ossora accounts for 52.3% of the district's total population.

Ethnic composition (2010):
 Russians – 61.0%
 Koryaks – 31.8%
 Ukrainians – 2.5%
 Tatars – 1.0%
 Others – 3.7%
Karaginsky District is at one end of the world's longest estimated straight-line path over water (32,090 km, ending at the Sonmiani in the Balochistan province in Pakistan).

References

Notes

Sources

Districts of Kamchatka Krai